The Glenfinnan Monument is a Category A listed monument in Glenfinnan, Scotland, erected in 1814 and dedicated to the soldiers of Loudon's Highlanders, who fought in the Jacobite rising of 1745.

By 1814, the Jacobite cause was no longer a political threat to the Hanoverian monarchy. Alexander Macdonald of Glenaladale, a minor branch of the Clan Donald, built the tower to commemorate the raising of the standard of the Young Pretender. The statue of an unknown Highlander, referred to at the point of commission as Charles Edward Stewart, by John Greenshields, was added in 1835.

The monument's location at Glenfinnan was made possible because of a new road (now the A830), built by Thomas Telford and opened in 1812, between Fort William and Arisaig.

Since 1938, the monument has been in the care of the National Trust for Scotland. The Trust has constructed a visitor centre, providing tickets, information, exhibitions, a shop, a café and toilets. The tower is also a monument to Alexander Macdonald, who died before its completion. Jacobite enthusiasts gather at the tower each year on 19 August to remember the rising of 1745.

Gallery

See also
List of Category A listed buildings in Highland

References

National Trust for Scotland properties
1814 sculptures
1814 establishments in Scotland
Category A listed buildings in Highland (council area)
Listed monuments and memorials in Scotland
Outdoor sculptures in Scotland
Statues in Scotland
Stone sculptures